The chairman of the Conservative Party in the United Kingdom is responsible for party administration and overseeing the Conservative Campaign Headquarters, formerly Conservative Central Office.

When the Conservatives are in government, the officeholder is usually a member of the Cabinet holding a sinecure position such as Minister without Portfolio. Deputy or Vice Chairmen of the Conservative Party may also be appointed, with responsibility for specific aspects of the party. The Chairman of the Conservative Party is Greg Hands who has been in the role since 7 February 2023. The role of Deputy Chairman is currently held by five Members of Parliament, they are: Jack Lopresti (with responsibility for Veterans and Law and Order), Nickie Aiken, Lee Anderson, Luke Hall and Matt Vickers. Positions of Vice Chairman are held by Saqib Bhatti (Business), Sara Britcliffe (Youth) and Alexander Stafford (Policy).
 
The role was created in 1911 in response to the Conservative party's defeat in the second 1910 general election. The position is not subject to election, as it is given by the party leader.

List

Key

List

See also
1922 Committee – the parliamentary body of the Conservative Party, which has its own Chairman

References
Notes

Bibliography
Ball, Stuart, ed. (1998) The Conservative Party Since 1945, Manchester: Manchester University Press.  
Conservatives Party Structure and Organisation

External links
Meet the Chairmen – conservatives.com

Organisation of the Conservative Party (UK)
Conservative Party (UK) officials